The Global Meteoric Water Line (GMWL) describes the global annual average relationship between hydrogen and oxygen isotope (Oxygen-18 and Deuterium) ratios in natural meteoric waters. The GMWL was first developed in 1961 by Harmon Craig, and has subsequently been widely used to track water masses in environmental geochemistry and hydrogeology.

Development and Definition of GMWL 
When working on the global annual average isotopic composition of Oxygen-18 and Deuterium (2H) in meteoric water, the geochemist Harmon Craig observed a correlation between these two isotopes. The equation for GMWL was then developed and defined by Harmon Craig:

Where δ18O and δ2H (also known as δD) are the ratio of heavy to light isotopes (e.g. 18O/16O, 2H/1H).

The relationship of δ18O  and δ2H in meteoric water is caused by mass dependent fractionation of oxygen and hydrogen isotopes between evaporation from ocean seawater and condensation from vapor. As oxygen isotopes (18O and 16O) and hydrogen isotopes (2H and 1H) have different masses, they behave differently in the evaporation and condensation processes, and thus result in the fractionation between 18O and 16O as well as 2H and 1H. Equilibrium fractionation causes the isotope ratios of δ18O and δ2H to vary between localities within the area. The fractionation processes can be influenced by a number of factors including: temperature, latitude, continentality, and most importantly, humidity,.

Applications 
Craig observed that δ18O and δ2H isotopic composition of cold meteoric water from sea ice in the Arctic and Antarctica are much more negative than that in warm meteoric water from the tropic. A correlation between temperature (T) and δ18O was proposed later in the 1970s. Such correlation is then applied to study surface temperature change over time. The δ18O composition in ancient meteoric water, preserved in ice cores, can also be collected and applied to reconstruct paleoclimate.

A meteoric water line can be calculated for a given area, named as local meteoric water line (LMWL), and used as a baseline within that area. Local meteoric water line can differ from the global meteoric water line in slope and intercept. Such deviated slope and intercept is a result largely from humidity. In 1964, the concept of deuterium excess d (d=δ2H - 8δ18O) was proposed. Later, a parameter of deuterium excess as a function of humidity has been established, as such the isotopic composition in local meteoric water can be applied to trace local relative humidity, study local climate and used as a tracer of climate change.

In hydrogeology, the δ18O and δ2H composition in groundwater are often used to study the origin of groundwater and groundwater recharge.

Recently it has been shown that, even taking into account the standard deviation related to instrumental errors and the natural variability of the amount-weighted precipitations, the LMWL calculated with the EIV (error in variable regression) method has no differences on the slope compared to classic OLSR (ordinary least square regression) or other regression methods. However, for certain purposes such as the evaluation of the shifts from the line of the geothermal waters, it would be more appropriate to calculate the so-called "prediction interval" or "error wings" related to LMWL.

See also 
 Isotopic fractionation
 Meteoric water
 Water cycle

References 

Precipitation
Isotopes
Hydrology